Oregon Business may refer to:

Oregon Business Development Department, a U.S. state agency
Oregon Business (magazine), an American magazine